Ng Kwan-yau (born 19 February 1997) is a Hong Kong female tennis player.

Career
As a professional tennis player, she has a career-high doubles ranking by the Women's Tennis Association (WTA) of 452, achieved February 2020.

Playing for Hong Kong Fed Cup team, she has a career win–loss record of 6–5.

Ng made her WTA Tour main-draw debut at the 2016 Guangzhou International Open, where she lost to Sabine Lisicki in the first round.

ITF Circuit finals

Doubles (1–1)

Fed Cup participation

Doubles (6–4)

References

External links
 
 
 

1997 births
Living people
Hong Kong female tennis players
Tennis players at the 2018 Asian Games
Asian Games competitors for Hong Kong